Aria del Gran Duca is a popular melody and ground bass originating in a number by Emilio de Cavalieri in the Florentine Intermedio of 1592. It spread over Europe and was used as a basis of compositions by numerous other Renaissance composers, both anonymous and named, such as Santino Garsi da Parma, Peter Philips, Sweelinck, and Banchieri.

Compositions by Emilio de' Cavalieri
Renaissance music